Labour Party leadership elections were held in the following countries in 1983:

1983 Labour Party leadership election (UK)
1983 New Zealand Labour Party leadership election